Justine Brasseur (born July 10, 2001) is a retired Canadian pair skater. With former partner, Mark Bardei, she is the 2019 CS Warsaw Cup bronze medalist.

With former partner Mathieu Ostiguy, she placed seventh at the 2016 World Junior Championships.

Personal life 
Justine Brasseur was born on July 10, 2001, in LaSalle, Quebec. She is the niece of 1993 World pair skating champion Isabelle Brasseur.

Career

Early years 
Brasseur began learning to skate in 2003.

She teamed up with Mathieu Ostiguy in May 2014. The pair placed fourth at the 2016 Youth Olympics in Hamar, Norway, and seventh at the 2016 World Junior Championships in Debrecen, Hungary. They were coached by Bruno Marcotte, Richard Gauthier, Sylvie Fullum, and Julie Marcotte.

In September 2017, Brasseur appeared with Mark Bardei on the entry list for a Quebec competition. They later withdrew from the event.

2018–2019 season
Brasseur/Bardei were scheduled to make their international debut at the 2018 CS Golden Spin of Zagreb, but withdrew from the event.  They competed at the 2019 Canadian Championships, placing fifth overall, and coming third in the free skate.  Brasseur deemed it "not our best performance", but both enjoyed competing again after some years away.

2019–2020 season
Making their international debut together, Brasseur/Bardei competed on the Challenger series at the 2019 CS Warsaw Cup.  Fourth in the short program and third in the free skate, they won the bronze medal.  They placed fourth at the 2020 Canadian Championships.

In April, it was announced that they had split.

2020–2021 season
In October of 2020, Brasseur announced that she had formed a new partnership with Zachary Daleman, and they were added to Skate Canada's NextGen program.  Training in Oakville under Bruno Marcotte and Meagan Duhamel, they competed for the first time at the Ontario sectionals in November.  They subsequently competed at the virtual 2021 Skate Canada Challenge, placing sixth, which would have qualified them to the 2021 Canadian Championships had they not been cancelled due to the COVID-19 pandemic.

Programs

With Daleman

With Bardei

With Ostiguy

Competitive highlights 
CS: Challenger Series; JGP: Junior Grand Prix''

Pairs with Daleman

Pairs with Bardei

Pairs with Ostiguy

Single skating

References

External links 

 
 

2001 births
Canadian female pair skaters
Figure skaters at the 2016 Winter Youth Olympics
Living people
People from LaSalle, Quebec
Figure skaters from Montreal